The Vermillion–Newcastle Bridge is a Nebraska and South Dakota Border crossing of the Missouri River. It joins Nebraska Highway 15 to South Dakota Highway 19.

The Dedication Ceremony was held on November 10, 2001. The dedication ceremonies were held on the Nebraska side of the bridge at the overlook.

The bridge crosses the Missouri National Recreational River, a unit of the National Park Service (NPS). The NPS maintains the Mulberry Bend Overlook on the Nebraska side of the bridge with scenic overlooks and a 3/4 mile trail along the Missouri River.

See also
Missouri National Recreational River
List of crossings of the Missouri River

External links
Mulberry Bend Overlook - Missouri National Recreational River
Missouri National Recreational River

References

Road bridges in Nebraska
Bridges completed in 2001
Buildings and structures in Dixon County, Nebraska
Buildings and structures in Clay County, South Dakota
Road bridges in South Dakota
Metal bridges in the United States
Girder bridges in the United States
2001 establishments in South Dakota
2001 establishments in Nebraska